Inquisitor rubens is a species of sea snail, a marine gastropod mollusk in the family Pseudomelatomidae, the turrids and allies.

Description
The length of the shell attains 21 mm.

Distribution
This marine species occurs in the Gulf of Aden

References

 Morassi, M. (1998b) A new species of Inquisitor (Gastropoda: Turridae) from the Gulf of Aden. Conchiglia, 30(289), 43–44.

External links
 

rubens
Gastropods described in 1998